Phiditia minor is a moth in the Phiditiidae family. It was described by Schaus in 1924.

References

Bombycoidea
Moths described in 1924